Jordy Makengo Basambundu (born 3 August 2001) is a French professional footballer who plays as a centre-back for SC Freiburg II.

Career statistics

References

2001 births
Living people
Sportspeople from Saint-Denis, Seine-Saint-Denis
Footballers from Seine-Saint-Denis
French footballers
Association football central defenders
Championnat National 3 players
Championnat National 2 players
3. Liga players
Paris 13 Atletico players
AJ Auxerre players
SC Freiburg players
SC Freiburg II players
French expatriate footballers
French expatriate sportspeople in Germany
Expatriate footballers in Germany
Black French sportspeople
French sportspeople of Democratic Republic of the Congo descent